The Tentera Udara Diraja Brunei (TUDB) Alap-Alap Formation (Kestrel Formation) is the official aerobatic display team of the Royal Brunei Air Force (RBAirF).

Aircraft
The Alap-Alap Formation display team uses the Pilatus PC-7 Mk.II turboprop aircraft, an aircraft purchased from Switzerland in 1997.  The aircraft are liveried in a white, blue, red, and yellow colour-scheme, and each aircraft have two under-wing smoke pods which generate white smoke.

Currently the Royal Brunei Air Force have a total of four PC-7 Mk.II aircraft.  The aircraft are under the management of No 63 Squadron TUDB, a squadron of the training wing located at the Royal Brunei Air Force Base, Rimba.

Pilots
Identified by their respective 'Eagle' call signs, the display team consists of three pilots.  One pilot is local, from the Royal Brunei Air Force, and two remaining pilots are from the British Royal Air Force (RAF), one on loan from the RAF and the other directly contracted to the RBAF.  All are qualified flying instructor (QFI) pilots.
Eagle One: Capt (LS) Richard Frick
Eagle Two: Lieutenant Colonel (U) Pg Mohd Zulhusmi Bin Pg Mohd Roslan
Eagle Three: Richard Homer

Displays
Alap-Alap Formation have displayed during the Royal Brunei Armed Forces (RBAF) 50th Anniversary, and continue frequent training.

References

Aerobatic teams
Aviation in Brunei
Establishments in Brunei